The Battle of Manantiales was fought in southwestern Uruguay as part of the internal conflict between the Blancos and the Colorados that had been going on intermittently since the country's independence. The Blancos, led by Timoteo Aparicio, were leading a rebellion to overthrow the Government of Uruguay, controlled by the Colorados since the end of the Uruguayan War.

Conflicts in 1871
1871 in Uruguay
Battles involving Uruguay